UTC+10:00 is an identifier for a time offset from UTC of +10:00. This time is used in:

As standard time (year-round)
Principal cities: Brisbane, Gold Coast, Vladivostok, Khabarovsk, Port Moresby, Dededo, Saipan

North Asia
Russia – Vladivostok Time
Far Eastern Federal District
Jewish Autonomous Oblast, Khabarovsk Krai, Primorsky Krai, Sakha Republic, Oymyakonsky, Ust-Yansky, Verkhoyansky and districts of the Sakha Republic (central part; east of 140 degrees longitude and including the Abyysky, Allaikhovsky, Momsky, Nizhnekolymsky, and Srednekolymsky districts)

Oceania

Pacific Ocean

Australasia
Australia – Eastern Standard Time (AEST)
Queensland

Micronesia
Federated States of Micronesia
Chuuk
Yap
United States - Chamorro Time Zone
Guam
Northern Mariana Islands

Melanesia
Papua New Guinea
All of the country except Autonomous Region of Bougainville
Highlands Region
Chimbu
Eastern Highlands 
Enga
Hela
Jiwaka
Southern Highlands
Western Highlands
Islands Region
East New Britain
Manus
New Ireland
West New Britain
Momase Region
East Sepik
Madang
Morobe
Sadun (West Sepik)
Southern Region
Central
Gulf
Milne Bay
Oro (Northern)
Western

Antarctica

Southern Ocean
Some bases in Antarctica. See also Time in Antarctica.
Australia
Australian Antarctic Territory
Macquarie Island
France
French Southern and Antarctic Lands
Adélie Land
Dumont d'Urville Station

As standard time (Southern Hemisphere winter)
Principal cities: Canberra, Sydney, Melbourne, Hobart

Oceania
Australia – Eastern Standard Time (AEST)
Australian Capital Territory
Jervis Bay Territory
New South Wales (except Broken Hill and its surrounds, as well as Lord Howe Island)
Tasmania
Victoria

Discrepancies between official UTC+10:00 and geographical UTC+10:00

Areas in UTC+10:00 longitudes using other time zones 
Using UTC+09:00

Japan
 The eastern parts of Hokkaido, including Obihiro, Kushiro, and Nemuro
 Minami-Tori-shima in Ogasawara municipality
Russia
 New Siberian Islands 
Novaya Sibir
Faddeyevsky Island
A small part of Kotelny Island 
The eastern part of Great Lyakhovsky Island

Using UTC+11:00
 Russia
 Sakhalin Oblast (eastern part of Sakhalin Island and Russian territory of Kuril Islands) 
 The most part of Magadan Oblast
 Sakha Republic (eastern part; Oymyakonsky, Ust-Yansky, and Verkhoyansky districts)
Micronesia
 The western part of Pohnpei
Papua New Guinea
 Autonomous Region of Bougainville, except island in very east
Solomon Islands
 Shortland Islands
 Choiseul, with an exception in very east
 The western part of New Georgia Islands

Areas outside UTC+10:00 longitudes using UTC+10:00 time

Areas between 127°30′ E and 142°30′ E ("physical" UTC+09:00) 
From north to south:

Russia
 Central part of Sakha Republic
 Most of Khabarovsk Krai
 Jewish Autonomous Oblast
 Primorsky Krai
Papua New Guinea 
 The very westernmost parts in the country
Australia 
 The western parts of Queensland
 The westernmost parts of New South Wales and Victoria, except Broken Hill (standard time)

References

External links

Find cities currently in UTC+10

UTC offsets